Attitude: The New Subversive Cartoonists is a series of anthologies of alternative comics, photos and artists' interviews edited by Universal Press Syndicate editorial cartoonist Ted Rall. The books were designed by J. P. Trostle, news editor of EditorialCartoonists.com. Two sequels and three spin-off titles have been published to date. A group of cartoonists featured in the Attitude series formed the organization Cartoonists With Attitude in June 2006; the group hosts slideshow and panel events around the country to promote the series and alternative political cartooning. Ted Rall created the compilation with the intention of publishing artists who were hard-up for work or otherwise had difficulties relating to the public.

Attitude: The New Subversive Political Cartoonists

Attitude: The New Subversive Political Cartoonists focuses on cartoonists whose work appears in alternative weekly newspapers with a view toward defining a new genre of political comics that, in Rall's words, are "too alternative for the mainstream and too mainstream for the underground."

The Minneapolis Star Tribune wrote: "Some of the cartoons are type-dominated (Don Asmussen's); many are not artistically pleasing; several would not pass the standards for a family newspaper." "There is moral rage, drama and righteousness that are both breezy and mortally serious," wrote The Baltimore Sun. "This is provocative, if often still rough and immature, stuff. And if history is still a guide, many of these artists will emerge as the best of the next generation of mainstream newspaper cartoonists." The American Library Association's Booklist wrote that "Whereas old-school editorial cartoonists rely on timeworn traditions, topics, and techniques, the new breed tackles contemporary concerns, such as commercialism and environmentalism ... Their drawings are usually subservient to their scripts, and both take a back seat to their attitude ... The best of them possess so much lacerating wit and unswerving commitment that they fairly shame their hidebound mainstream counterparts into retirement."

Attitude: The New Subversive Political Cartoonists made The Progressives list of "Favorite books of 2002."

The artists included and their comics are:

 Lloyd Dangle: Troubletown
 Andy Singer: No Exit
 Don Asmussen: The San Francisco Comic Strip
 Tom Tomorrow: This Modern World
 Clay Butler: Sidewalk Bubblegum
 Peter Kuper: Eye of the Beholder
 Jen Sorensen: Slowpoke
 Scott Bateman
 Tim Eagan: Deep Cover, Subconscious Comics
 Derf Backderf: The City
 Lalo Alcaraz: La Cucaracha
 Joe Sharpnack
 Eric Bezdek: Corn Valley
 Ruben Bolling: Tom the Dancing Bug
 William L. Brown: Citizen Bill
 Ward Sutton: Schlock 'n' Roll
 Stephanie McMillan: Minimum Security
 Mickey Siporin: America Outta Line
 Jim Siergey: Cultural Jet Lag
 Ted Rall: Search and Destroy
 Matt Wuerker: Lint Trap

Attitude 2: The New Subversive Alternative CartoonistsAttitude 2: The New Subversive Alternative Cartoonists followed Attitude: The New Subversive Political Cartoonists by two years. For the second book in the series, Rall turned to alternative weekly-oriented cartoonists whose work leaned more toward general humor than the original volume. It also includes several political cartoonists.

The San Diego Union-Tribune described Attitude 2 as "the ribald, self-righteous comix in the best alternative weeklies ... 'Question Authority' is their collective motto, and as long as they're making people mad as hell, they must be doing something right." The United Kingdom's The Observer wrote that "This is satire in an angry-youth-with-piercings mode. The spiritual forebears are the cartoonists of the 1960s-70s underground (Robert Crumb et al.) but the use of clip art and scratchy line techniques mark this out as a very contemporary collection, and happily the humour is of high quality." Publishers Weekly wrote that "These cartoonists are, generally, writers who use the medium to get across verbal puns or simple, angry screeds, regardless of visual style or any other comics-based concerns. ... This worthy compilation of cartoonists who otherwise wouldn't be seen outside of their local weeklies showcases the continuing vitality of comics as social criticism."

The artists included and their comics are:

 Keith Knight: The K Chronicles
 Neil Swaab: Rehabilitating Mr. Wiggles
 Emily S. Flake: Lulu Eightball
 Tak Toyoshima: Secret Asian Man
 Brian Sendelbach: Smell of Steve, Inc.
 Jennifer Berman: Berman
 Alison Bechdel: Dykes to Watch Out For
 Shannon Wheeler: Too Much Coffee Man
 Mikhaela B. Reid: The Boiling Point
 Aaron McGruder: The Boondocks
 Tim Kreider: The Pain – When Will It End?
 Barry Deutsch: Ampersand
 David Rees: Get Your War On
 Max Cannon: Red Meat
 Eric Orner: The Mostly Unfabulous Social Life of Ethan Green
 Greg Peters: Suspect Device
 Jason Youngbluth: Deep Fried
 Steven Notley: Bob the Angry Flower
 Justin Jones: Soda-Pong
 Kevin Moore: In Contempt Comics
 Marian Henley: Maxine!

Attitude 3: The New Subversive Online CartoonistsAttitude 3: The New Subversive Online Cartoonists''' is the third volume in the Attitude series. Whereas volumes one and two of the series concentrated on print cartoonists with an alternative bent, Attitude 3 focuses exclusively upon webcomics.

The artists included and their comics are:

 Rob Balder: PartiallyClips Dale Beran and David Hellman: A Lesson Is Learned But The Damage Is Irreversible Matt Bors: Idiot Box Steven L. Cloud: Boy on a Stick and Slither M.e. Cohen: HumorInk Chris Dlugosz: Pixel Thomas K. Dye: Newshounds Mark Fiore: Fiore Animated Cartoons Dorothy Gambrell: Cat and Girl Nicholas Gurewitch: The Perry Bible Fellowship Brian McFadden: Big Fat Whale Eric Millikin: Fetus-X Ryan North: Dinosaur Comics August J. Pollak: XQUZYPHYR & Overboard Mark Poutenis: Thinking Ape Blues Jason Pultz: Comic Strip Adam Rust: Adam's Rust D. C. Simpson: I Drew This & Ozy and Millie Ben Smith: Fighting Words Richard Stevens: Diesel Sweeties Michael Zole: Death to the Extremist''

References

External links
 Ted Rall's book page
 Cartoonists With Attitude official website

NBM Publishing titles
Comics anthologies
Webcomics in print